PanARMENIAN.Net is the first Armenian online news agency, an internet portal based in Yerevan, Armenia. 
The PanARMENIAN.Net information-analytical portal is one of the projects of the "PanArmenian Network" NGO. It was launched on April 2, 2000. PanARMENIAN.Net provides information and analysis about the main events in the social and political life of Armenia, as well as events taking place all over the world that are connected with Armenia directly or indirectly. Topics covered: Politics, Armenia and World, Society, Economics, Region, Sport, Culture, IT & Telecommunications.

PAN Photo Agency, established by PanARMENIAN Network in 2009, is a major news & creative photography agency in Armenia. The photo agency covers all major social-political, business, cultural and sport events happening in the country, also presenting reports from all around the world via its international photographers and partners.

PanARMENIAN Network NGO
PanARMENIAN Network has started its activity from 1999. The mission of the organization is to contribute to the promotion of the national, historical, cultural and scientific heritage and values among the international community through modern information and communication technologies.

PAN News Agency
PAN News Agency (formerly known as PanARMENIAN.Net News Agency) was established in 2000 with a focus on Armenian Diaspora. Besides the own content produced by in-house journalists and editors, the news service of the PanARMENIAN.Net uses the information flows of local and world news agencies.

PAN News agency content is being spread out via various social platforms, publishing partners and content aggregates.

PAN News Agency was a pioneering news organization in Armenia to use a Creative Commons license on all its content and also include new content types in the news stories (photo stories, infographics and editorial cartoons)
The news agency publishes its content in three languages: Armenian, Russian and English.

Most of the users come from Armenia, United States, Europe and Russia.

PAN Photo Agency

PAN Photo Agency (formerly known as PanARMENIAN Photo) was established in 2009. It quickly became one of the major independent news & creative photography agencies in Armenia. The agency covers major social-political, business, cultural and sport events happening in the country and presents reports from all around the world via its international photographers and partners.
PAN Photo cooperates with and provides photo wire for major international photo agencies such as Associated Press (AP), Agence France Press (AFP), Reuters, RIA Novosti and Itar-Tass, European Pressphoto Agency and others.

PAN Photo images have been featured in numerous international media outlets including The New York Times, CNN.com, BBC, The Wall Street Journal, Al Jazeera America, Libération, San Francisco Chronicle, Washington Post, The Guardian, Vogue, Esquire and others.

PanARMENIAN.Net on Social Media
PanARMENIAN was also one of the first news service in Armenia to adopt social media and establish pages in Facebook and Twitter. PanARMENIAN.Net's content policy on social media channels has been noted as a good practice a number of times, since it was tailored for the specific audience of social media users. The Facebook page audience is notably different from the website's partly due to its language limitation (Armenian only), special way of posting content and social-media first policy resulting in publishing all breaking news on the page first.

Awards and recognition
 2009 (April): European Integration NGO and the British Embassy in Yerevan praised PanARMENIAN.Net, for the second time, as "the news agency with best coverage of European events", between 5 agencies monitored as part of the framework "Monitoring of European Events Coverage".
 2009 (May): Union Of Armenians Of Russia Award received by PanARMENIAN.Net News agency, "for providing true and impartial information in three languages".
 2011 (July): Freedom of Information Center of Armenia awarded the "Golden Key" to PanARMENIAN.Net, for being "the media outlet most actively covering Freedom of Information issues".
 2012 (July): Yerevan Press Club award premiered PAN Photo Agency "for revealing new professional perspectives".
 2013 (March): Gyumri Asparez Club premiered PanARMENIAN.Net's photo service "for the quality photojournalism", on the Freedom of Speech Day.

Publications

 "12 Days of Fest de Cannes" photo album, 2011
 “From disaster relief to risk reduction” – Photography workshops for children in Armenian regions was concluded in a photo stories book commissioned by UNDP,  2012
 "99" book dedicated to Armenian genocide, 2014. Contains all important facts about the 1915 events everyone needs to know.

Notable Projects and Exhibitions
 spotlight.am citizen photojournalism platform funded through a Department of State Public Affairs Section grant.

 “The Armenian Highland in Photographs” Charity Auction organized together with UNICEF in Armenia and Honorary Consulate of Slovak Republic in Armenia, 2013
 “Speaking in a loud voice” – training and networking of emerging photographers and journalists in Eastern Partnership Countries, with Sputnik Photos, 2013-2014
 PANMAN editorial cartoon magazine funded by the “Alternative resources in media” project financed by the USAID.
 PANreport citizen journalism platform funded by UNESCO office in Moscow.
 500 photos “experimental” exhibition, February 2011 
 "Best photos of PAN Photo Agency 2009-2011" exhibition, June 2011
 “12 Days in Cannes” photo exhibition,  July 2011
 "12 Days of Fest de Cannes", August 2012
 "Yerevan: a glimpse from the XXI century" photo exhibition organized together with the Ministry of Culture of Armenia inside Yerevan Metro stations, September 2013
 "#Morooq" - The bearded men project exhibition, April 2014
 "The Face of Migration" photoexhibition curated by PAN Photo, September 2014
 "What Women Want" photo project for Lenta.ru, March 2015
 "100 Years of Silence" photo project for Lenta.ru, April 2015

References

External links
Official website
PAN Photo website

News agencies based in Armenia
Free-content websites
Armenian news websites